Gribi is a surname. Notable people with this surname:

Michelle Gribi (born 1992), Swiss curler
Reto Gribi (born 1991), Swiss curler

See also
Ghribi, a surname